Hassi Amor is a small village situated in the southeast of Tunisia.

Location
It is within the municipality of Medenine and is 56 kilometres from the centre of Medenine. It is built near the National Road N1 so anyone going to Jerba, Zarzis or Ben Guerden, which are the main three big towns in Medenine, should pass through this small village.

Demographics
The number of the village is not known exactly, but it varies from 2000 to 3000 maximum.

Economy
Its main activity is agriculture with olive trees, wheat, vegetable and fruits.

Infrastructure
It has three primary schools and a college. There is football club called Avenir Sportif De Hassi Amor ASHA), but it no longer exists except for children, and is run by the famous football player Bak Ahmed Showatt. 

Populated places in Tunisia